DWB may refer to:

Media
 Deutsches Wörterbuch, the largest and most comprehensive dictionary of the German language in existence
 Dictionary of Welsh Biography, a biographical dictionary of Welsh people who have made a significant contribution to Welsh life
 Dreamwatch (previously Doctor Who Bulletin), British magazine covering science fiction and fantasy films, books and television programmes
 "DWB", a ninth-season episode of the American police procedural and legal drama Law & Order
 DW B, the oldest literary magazine in Flanders

Other
 Deutscher Werkbund, a German Arts and Crafts Movement, founded as an association in 1907, with sister associations in Austria (Österreichischer Werkbund founded in 1912), Switzerland (Schweizerischer Werkbund since 1913), and in Italy, a predecessor to the Bauhaus
 members of the present-day Deutscher Werkbund who are entitled to use "dwb" as post nominals
 Driving while black, a sardonic description of racial profiling of African-American motor vehicle drivers
 Warm summer subtype (Dwb), a category of humid continental climate
Doctors Without Borders, also known as Médecins Sans Frontières, international humanitarian organisation